The 51st Filmfare Awards took place on 25 February 2006 at the Bandra-Kurla Complex in Mumbai. The show was hosted by Javed Jaffrey.

Parineeta led the ceremony with 13 nominations, followed by Black with 11 nominations.

Black received 11 awards at the ceremony – a record at the time – including Best Film, Best Film (Critics), Best Director (Sanjay Leela Bhansali), Best Actor, Best Actor (Critics) (both for Amitabh Bachchan), Best Actress, Best Actress (Critics) (both for Rani Mukherji) and Best Supporting Actress (Ayesha Kapur, thus becoming the youngest nominee and eventual winner of an acting Filmfare Award).

Amitabh Bachchan received dual nominations for Best Actor for his performances in Black and Sarkar, winning for the former.

Rani Mukerji also received dual nominations for Best Actress for her performances in Black and Bunty Aur Babli, winning for the former.

Main awards

Best Film 
 Black 
Bunty Aur Babli
No Entry
Page 3
Parineeta

Best Director 
 Sanjay Leela Bhansali for Black 
Madhur Bhandarkar for Page 3
Nagesh Kukunoor for Iqbal
Pradeep Sarkar for Parineeta
Ram Gopal Verma for Sarkar

Best Actor 
 Amitabh Bachchan – Black 
Aamir Khan – Mangal Pandey: The Rising
Abhishek Bachchan – Bunty Aur Babli
Amitabh Bachchan – Sarkar
Saif Ali Khan – Parineeta

Best Actress 
 Rani Mukherji – Black 
Preity Zinta – Salaam Namaste
Rani Mukherji – Bunty Aur Babli
Sharmila Tagore – Viruddh
Vidya Balan – Parineeta

Best Supporting Actor 
 Abhishek Bachchan – Sarkar 
Amitabh Bachchan – Bunty Aur Babli
Arshad Warsi – Salaam Namaste
Naseeruddin Shah – Iqbal
Sanjay Dutt – Parineeta

Best Supporting Actress 
 Ayesha Kapur – Black 
Bipasha Basu – No Entry
Sandhya Mridul – Page 3
Shefali Shah – Waqt: The Race Against Time
Shweta Prasad – Iqbal

Best Actor in a Comic Role 
 Akshay Kumar – Garam Masala 
Anil Kapoor – No Entry
Javed Jaffrey – Salaam Namaste
Rajpal Yadav – Waqt: The Race Against Time
Salman Khan – No Entry

Best Actor in a Negative Role 
 Nana Patekar – Apaharan 
Ajay Devgan – Kaal
Amrita Singh – Kalyug
Kay Kay Menon – Sarkar
Pankaj Kapoor – Dus

Best Music Director 
 Bunty Aur Babli – Shankar–Ehsaan–Loy 
Aashiq Banaya Aapne – Himesh Reshammiya
Dus – Vishal–Shekhar
Lucky: No Time for Love – Adnan Sami
Parineeta – Shantanu Moitra

Best Lyricist 
 Bunty Aur Babli – Gulzar for Kajra Re 
Aashiq Banaya Aapne – Sameer for Aashiq Banaya Aapne
Bunty Aur Babli – Gulzar for Chup Chup Ke
Paheli – Gulzar for Dheere Jalna
Parineeta – Swanand Kirkire for Piyu Bole
Best Playback Singer, Male

 Aashiq Banaya Aapne – Himesh Reshammiya for Aashiq Banaya Aapne 
Dus – Shaan and KK for Dus Bahane
Paheli – Sonu Nigam for Dheere Jalna
Parineeta – Sonu Nigam for Piyu Bole
Zeher – Atif Aslam for Woh Lamhe

Best Playback Singer, Female 
 Bunty Aur Babli – Alisha Chinai for Kajra Re 
Dus – Sunidhi Chauhan  for Deedar De
Parineeta – Shreya Ghoshal for Piyu Bole
Parineeta – Sunidhi Chauhan for Kaisi Paheli
Zeher – Shreya Ghoshal for Agar Tum Mil Jaao

Best Action 
 Dus – Allan Amin

Best Art Direction 
 Parineeta – Keshto Mandal, Pradeep Sarkar and Tanushree Sarkar

Best Background Score 
 Black – Monty Sharma

Best Cinematography 
 Black – Ravi K. Chandran

Best Editing 
 Black – Bela Segal

Best Screenplay 
 Page 3 – Nina Arora & Manoj Tyagi (as per titles of the film)

Best Dialogue 
 Apaharan – Prakash Jha

Best Story 
 Hazaaron Khwaishein Aisi – Ruchi Narain, Shivkumar Subramaniam and Sudhir Mishra

Best Sound Design 
 Parineeta – Bishwadeep Chatterjee

Lifetime Achievement Award 
 Shabana Azmi

Filmfare Power Award 
 Aditya Chopra and Yash Chopra

Best Debut, Male 
 Shiney Ahuja – Hazaaron Khwaishein Aisi

Best Debut, Female 
 Vidya Balan – Parineeta

Critics' awards

Best Film 
 Black

Best Actor 
 Amitabh Bachchan – Black

Best Actress 
 Rani Mukherji – Black

See also 

 Filmfare Awards
 52nd Filmfare Awards
 List of highest-grossing Bollywood films

References 

 https://www.imdb.com/event/ev0000245/2006/

Filmfare Awards
2006 Indian film awards

fr:Filmfare Awards 2008